The Green Booth House is a historic house at South Pecan Street and West Center Avenue in Searcy, Arkansas.  It is a single-story brick structure, with a broad gabled roof, and a wraparound front porch that extends to a carport on the left.  A gabled dormer projects from the center of the front roof slope, and the porch is supported by tapered columns set on brick piers.  Built c. 1925, the house is a fine example of the area's second phase of Craftsman architecture.

The house was listed on the National Register of Historic Places in 1991.

See also
National Register of Historic Places listings in White County, Arkansas

References

Houses on the National Register of Historic Places in Arkansas
Houses completed in 1925
Houses in Searcy, Arkansas
National Register of Historic Places in Searcy, Arkansas
1925 establishments in Arkansas
Bungalow architecture in Arkansas
American Craftsman architecture in Arkansas